Kelling Heath Park  is a small halt on the North Norfolk Railway (NNR), used mostly by hikers using Kelling Heath. It was not on the original British Rail line, but was opened after the line was preserved.

The station was opened in 1983 as part of the NNR's extension to Kelling; a very short half coach-length halt was constructed principally to serve the nearby caravan park. Upon the completion of the extension to Holt in 1989, Kelling Camp Halt was demolished and a new longer platform was constructed ¼ of a mile further up the hill to the west; the station was also renamed "Kelling Heath Park". In March 1998, a new down distant signal was brought into use at the eastern end of Kelling Cutting.

References

Heritage railway stations in Norfolk
Railway stations in Great Britain opened in 1983
Railway stations built for UK heritage railways